Joseph Young (1797–1881) was an early leader of the Church of Jesus Christ of Latter-day Saints; brother to Brigham Young.

Joseph Young may also refer to:

Joseph Young (artist) (1919–2007), American artist
Joseph Young (conductor) (born 1982), American orchestra conductor
Joseph Young (trade unionist) (1858–?), British trade union leader
Joseph Young Jr. (born 1964), American cartoonist and animator
Joseph Angell Young (1834–1875), apostle of the Church of Jesus Christ of Latter-day Saints; eldest son of Brigham Young
Joseph H. Young (1922–2015), American judge
Joseph M. Young, American diplomat
Joseph Young or Alton Milford Young (1884–1950), Ku Klux Klan member

See also
Joe Young (disambiguation)
Joseph Wesley Young House, a historic home in Hollywood, Florida